17002 / 01 Secunderabad–Sainagar Shirdi Express is a Express train belonging to Indian Railways Southern Railway zone that runs between  and  in India.

Service 
It operates as train number 17002 from Secunderabad Junction to Sainagar Shirdi and as train number 17001 in the reverse direction, serving the states of Telangana, Karnataka & Maharashtra.

Coaches

The 17002 / 01 Secunderabad–Sainagar Shirdi  Express has two AC 2-tier,  four AC 3-tier, 10 sleeper class, three general unreserved & two SLR (seating with luggage rake) coaches. It carries a pantry car.

As with most train services in India, coach composition may be amended at the discretion of Indian Railways depending on demand.

Routeing

Traction
As this route is going to be unelectrified, a Kazipet-based diesel WDM-3D loco pulls the train to its destination.

References

External links
17002 Secunderabad Junction Sainagar Shirdi Express at India Rail Info
17001 Sainagar Shirdi Secunderabad Junction Express at India Rail Info

Express trains in India
Rail transport in Telangana
Rail transport in Karnataka
Rail transport in Maharashtra
Transport in Secunderabad
Transport in Shirdi